Iván Calero Ruiz (born 21 April 1995) is a Spanish footballer who plays as either a right back or a right winger for FC Cartagena.

He began his career at Atlético Madrid, playing in its third and second teams before joining Derby County in 2014. He had two years at the English club, and spent a short loan at Burton Albion. Calero has represented Spain internationally, up to under-19 level.

Club career

Atlético Madrid
Born in Parla in the Community of Madrid, Calero graduated from local Atlético Madrid's youth system, and made his senior debut with the C-team in the 2011–12 campaign, in Tercera División. He appeared regularly in the following season, also making his senior debut with the reserves in Segunda División B on 9 September 2012, replacing Pedro Martín after 60 minutes of a 1–3 loss at CD Leganés.

On 20 February 2013 Calero was called up to the main squad by manager Diego Simeone for a UEFA Europa League match against Rubin Kazan. However, he remained unused in the eventual 1–0 away win.

On 19 May 2013, in only his second match with the reserves, Calero scored his first senior goal, netting the last of a 4–1 win at Rayo Vallecano B. He was definitely promoted to the B-team in the 2013 summer, and scored four goals in 29 matches in 2013–14.

Derby County
In July 2014, Calero went to Championship club Derby County, and signed a two-year deal with the Rams on 18 July. Manager Steve McLaren said "He's a young player with excellent pedigree. We are really pleased that he sees his future at Derby County."

Calero played his first match as a professional on 26 August, replacing Simon Dawkins for the last 20 minutes of a League Cup victory over Charlton Athletic at Pride Park, netting the game's only goal in the 87th minute. On 14 September he played in the league for the first time, replacing John Eustace for the final 13 minutes of a 1–1 draw away to rivals Nottingham Forest.

After spending time training there, Calero was loaned to nearby League Two club Burton Albion for a month on 2 February 2015. He was signed by Jimmy Floyd Hasselbaink, whom he had watched play for Atlético Madrid in 1999–2000, and said "He was a big hero because of his goals. He's one of the reasons I came...I can learn many things from him. It's a great opportunity for my development and to get some experience". Five days after signing he made his debut, replacing Adam McGurk for the last two minutes of a 3–1 win at Cheltenham Town. On 10 February he made his first start in his first match at the Pirelli Stadium, playing the first 64 minutes of a goalless draw against Wimbledon before being replaced by Abdenasser El Khayati.

After Calero returned to Derby, Burton were promoted to League One at the end of the season as champions, while Derby missed out on the play-offs with a 0–3 home defeat to Reading on the last day.

After appearing on the bench only once in the 2015–16 season, Calero was one of five Derby youngsters released at the end of the campaign.

Sparta Rotterdam
On 2 June 2016 Calero signed a two-year contract with Dutch club Sparta Rotterdam.

Elche
On 8 July 2017, Calero signed for Elche CF in the third division. On 27 July of the following year, after achieving promotion to Segunda División, he was loaned to fellow third division side Salamanca CF for one year.

Numancia / Málaga
On 8 July 2019, Calero joined CD Numancia on a two-year deal after terminating his contract with Elche. On 28 August of the following year, after suffering relegation, he signed a three-year contract with Málaga CF.

In December 2020, Calero suffered a serious knee injury, only returning to action the following September. On 15 January 2022, he moved to fellow second division side AD Alcorcón on loan for the remainder of the season.

Cartagena
On 3 July 2022, free agent Calero signed a three-year deal with FC Cartagena, still in the second tier.

International career
On 23 November 2010 Calero was called up to the Spain under-16s. He subsequently represented the under-17, under-18 and under-19 levels.

Personal life
Calero's father Julián had a lengthy career in coaching and management, including as assistant to Fernando Hierro for the Spain national team at the 2018 FIFA World Cup.

Career statistics

(Correct )

References

External links

Living people
1995 births
People from Parla
Footballers from the Community of Madrid
Spanish footballers
Association football defenders
Association football wingers
Segunda División players
Segunda División B players
Tercera División players
Atlético Madrid C players
Atlético Madrid B players
Elche CF players
CD Numancia players
Málaga CF players
AD Alcorcón footballers
FC Cartagena footballers
English Football League players
Derby County F.C. players
Burton Albion F.C. players
Sparta Rotterdam players
Spanish expatriate footballers
Expatriate footballers in England
Spanish expatriate sportspeople in England
Expatriate footballers in the Netherlands
Spanish expatriate sportspeople in the Netherlands
Spain youth international footballers